Richard IV may refer to:

 Richard IV of England (Blackadder), fictional character in TV series Blackadder
 Perkin Warbeck, pretender to the English throne
 Richard of Shrewsbury, 1st Duke of York, impersonated by Warbeck, and whom the Blackadder character was very loosely based on
 Richard IV, fictional character in TV programme The Palace
 Richard de la Pole, the Yorkist pretender, declared king of England by Louis of France in 1513.